Charles Dougherty (1801 – November 26, 1853) was an American lawyer, jurist, and politician.

Born in Oglethorpe County, Georgia to Charles and Rebecca Carlton Puryear Dougherty, the younger Dougherty studied law and began its practice in Athens, Georgia.  He became a leader in the Whig party as well as a judge in the Western Circuit of the state.   He married Elizabeth T. Moore on December 7, 1823, in Clarke County, Georgia.

In 1839, Dougherty ran as the Whig candidate for Governor of Georgia but lost by 2,000 votes to the Democratic candidate Charles McDonald.

Dougherty died in Athens in 1853 and was buried in the Old Athens Cemetery.  (He and his wife are believed to have been re-interred in Oconee Hill Cemetery, also in Athens.  See page 189, Oconee Hill Cemetery of Athens, Georgia, vol. I by Charlotte Thomas Marshall, 2009.  The hyperlinked image was taken in Old Athens Cemetery.) His namesake, Dougherty County, Georgia, was created by the Georgia General Assembly on December 15, 1853.

Notes

References
 Men of Mark in Georgia, A. B. Caldwell, 1912, pp.330-331
Georgia.gov entry for Dougherty County
GeorgiaInfo Dougherty County Courthouse history
Political Graveyard entry for Charles Dougherty
The Family History of John W. Pritchett
New Georgia Encyclopedia entry for Charles McDonald

External links

1801 births
1853 deaths
People from Oglethorpe County, Georgia
Politicians from Athens, Georgia
Georgia (U.S. state) lawyers
Georgia (U.S. state) state court judges
Dougherty County, Georgia
Georgia (U.S. state) Whigs
19th-century American politicians
19th-century American judges
19th-century American lawyers